10 series may refer to:

Electronics 

 GeForce 10 series graphics processing units made by Nvidia

Train types 

 Kyoto Municipal Subway 10 series electric multiple unit operating for the Kyoto Municipal Subway
 Osaka Municipal Subway 10 series electric multiple unit operating for Osaka Metro